The 2019–20 Highland Football League (known as the Breedon Highland League for sponsorship reasons) was the 117th season of the Highland Football League, and the 6th season as the fifth tier of the Scottish football pyramid system. The season began on 27 July 2019 and was scheduled to end on 18 April 2020. Cove Rangers were the reigning champions, but could not defend their title after being promoted to Scottish League Two.

On 13 March 2020, the league was indefinitely suspended due to the 2019–20 coronavirus outbreak and later curtailed. On 21 March, Brora Rangers were awarded the title following a vote of the league's member clubs. League positions were confirmed in August 2020 based on points per game in the curtailed season.

Teams

The following teams changed division after the 2018–19 season.

From Highland League
Promoted to League Two
Cove Rangers

Following Cove's promotion, the league decided in May 2019 to play the 2019–20 season with 17 teams, rather than invite a new member to replace Cove.

Stadia and locations
All grounds are equipped with floodlights as required by league regulations.

League table

Results

Notes

References

External links

Highland Football League seasons
5
Scottish
Scotland